The Jack Oatey Medal is awarded to the best player during the SANFL Grand Final. It has been awarded since 1981. In 2018, Mitch Grigg of Norwood became the first player to win the Jack Oatey Medal on a losing team, after his team were defeated by North Adelaide in the 2018 SANFL Grand Final.

Winners

Club totals

Best on ground before award 
Before the inception of the Jack Oatey Medal there was no official award for the best on ground in SANFL Grand Finals. However the media would often arrive at a consensus as to who was the best player on the ground.

References

External links
Jack Oatey Medallists at SANFL.com.au

South Australian National Football League
Australian rules football awards
Australian rules football-related lists